Mynydd-y-Garreg or Mynyddygarreg ("The mountain of the stone") is a village in the county of Carmarthenshire, West Wales. It borders the historic town of Kidwelly.

Governance
Mynydd-y-Garreg is in the Kidwelly community and shares with it a mayor and an elected council, Kidwelly Town Council.

Transport
By road, the village lies 1 km from the A484, which connects Llanelli and Carmarthen. For rail travel, Kidwelly railway station lies 4 km (2.5 miles) away by road. It provides a two-hourly daytime service on Mondays to Saturdays. Some trains reach as far as London and Manchester.

Bus services through Kidwelly provide links to Llanelli, Carmarthen, Swansea and other places.

Amenities
The village has a Welsh-medium primary school, Ysgol Mynydd-y-Garreg School.

The county mobile library service visits the village every Wednesday between 11.30 and 12.30.

The Bro Cydweli LMA group parish of the Church in Wales provides a bilingual afternoon service on the first and third Sundays of the month at St Teilo's Church, Mynyddygarreg. Saint Teilo (c. 500 – 9 c. 560) was a 6th-century British monk and early Welsh saint from Pembrokeshire.

The village has a local rugby union team called Mynydd-y-Garreg RFC. It offers training facilities and a playing field with a clubhouse.

The public house in the village, the Prince of Wales, had been recognised by the Campaign for Real Ale (CAMRA) Good Beer Guide. Nonetheless, it had to close in 2017.

Notable residents
Tom Beynon (1886–1961), a Presbyterian minister, author and noted historian; born and grew up in Mynydd-y-Garreg.
Leslie Williams (1922–2006), a Welsh dual-code international rugby union, and professional rugby league footballer 
Gordon Lewis (born 1936), a Welsh former rugby union, and professional rugby league footballer with over 400 club caps
Ray Gravell (1951–2007), Welsh national rugby union player; a road there was named after him, and after his death a sculpture erected in his honour at the Llanelli Scarlets' stadium Parc y Scarlets, where it stands on a plinth of stone quarried from the village.

Fossil remains
Smarts Quarry, half a mile to the east of the village, is a 2.6 ha Site of Special Scientific Interest notable for its quartzite fossil remains.

References

External links
Photographs of Mynydd-y-Garreg and surrounding area from the www.geograph.org.uk site

Kidwelly
Villages in Carmarthenshire